The Type 93 mine was a circular Japanese landmine used during the Second World War. It entered service in 1933. It used a simple fuze with a variable activation pressure, achieved through the use of different thickness shear wires. The main charge could be supplemented with additional explosives buried under the mine.

Specifications
 Diameter: 6.75 inches
 Height: 1.75 inches approx
 Weight: 3 lbs
 Explosive content: 2 lbs
 Operating pressure: 7 to 250 lbs (3 to 110 kg)

References

 HyperWar: Handbook on Japanese Military Forces
 TM-E 30-480

Land mines of Japan